Standard English School is a school located in Dasarahalli, Bangalore Urban district, Karnataka, India. The school was established in 1979 and was one of the earliest schools in this area. It was primarily built to provide affordable education to the students in this area.

This school has education levels starting from Nursery, Primary & Secondary level of school system, which is common across all of India. This school follows the state board syllabus of Karnataka state.

Standard Public School, catering ICSE syllabus was started in the year 2012. Permanent affiliation is granted for both ICSE and ISC.

Educational institutions established in 1979